The Harihara Deula or Twin Temples are dedicated to Lord Shiva and Lord Vishnu. They are situated near the bank of Mahanadi river, at Gandharadi village in Boudh district of Odisha, India.

Architecture
The architecture of the twin temples are supposed to be of late 10th century, which mark the rising and reforming stage of Kalinga architecture. The builders of this shrine are Somavaṃśī kings. It marks the harmony between the cults of Shiva and Vishnu. It was built at a time when other parts of India were busy in fighting between the two sects following above two forms of one supreme. The main Vimana is of Rekha Deula.The Jagamohana is of flat roofed temple.

Siddhesvara Temple
The Shiva Temple houses Shivalinga which is named as Siddhesvara. It is also same structure as above.

Nilamadhava Temple
The Vishnu Temple has a Vigraha  made of black chlorite and has four hands having all weapons and ornaments.

Transport
They are close to Boudh and transport facilities by bus are available from Bhubaneswar, Subarnapur and Berhampur up to Boudh.

External links
twin temples of Orissa
facts about siddhesvara
details of Nilamadhava Temple at Boudh
 images of twin temple

Hindu temples in Boudh
Vishnu temples
Shiva temples in Odisha